Chili shrimp ( or ) is a dish of stir-fried shrimp in chilli sauce (which may use doubanjiang) in Chinese cuisine. It is a part of both Sichuan and Shanghai cuisines.

In Japanese Chinese cuisine, ebi-chiri is derived from Shanghai-style Sichuan cuisine. It consists of stir-fried shrimp in chilli sauce. It has a history in Japan. According to Iron Chef, ebi-chiri was introduced to and popularized in Japan by Chen Kenmin, father of Iron Chef Chinese Chen Kenichi.

In Korean Chinese cuisine, chili shrimp is called kkansyo-saeu, a named consisting of the word kkansyo derived from Chinese gān shāo and saeu meaning "shrimp" in Korean, or chilli-saeu with the English-derived word chilli.

See also
 Chili chicken
 List of seafood dishes
 

Japanese Chinese cuisine
Korean Chinese cuisine
Shrimp dishes
Sichuan cuisine